Road routes in the Australian Capital Territory assist drivers navigating roads throughout the territory, or may have a second local name in addition to a primary name. The ACT previously used an older, numerical shield-based system, which was replaced by a newer, alphanumeric system in 2013. Many major roads in the ACT are not assigned a route number.

The ACT implemented the federally-issued National Routes system between 1955 and 1956, using white-and-black shields highlighting interstate links between major regional centres; some of these routes were later upgraded into National Highways using green-and-gold shields when the National Roads Act was passed in 1974. Seven Tourist routes were also allocated across the territory in early 1990, but were decommissioned by 2019. The alphanumeric system, introduced in 2013 (at the same time as New South Wales), has effectively replaced the previous scheme across the territory.

Roads are described in either a west-east or north–south alignment.

Current routes

Alphanumeric routes

The alphanumeric system, introduced in 2013 (at the same time as New South Wales switched to their own alphanumeric system, as they shared some route allocations), replaced the previous National Route and National Highway scheme across the territory. It consists of alphanumeric routes, a two-digit number prefixed with a letter (M, A, or B) that denotes the grade and importance of the road, displayed on signs as yellow text on a green background with a white border; the ACT is now the only jurisdiction in Australia to use a border around allocations (NSW, previously the only other state that used them, removed them in 2020).

Former routes

National Routes

National Routes were the first type of route numbering to be attempted in Australia on a large scale, signed with a white shield and black writing (similar in shape to the shield that appears on the Australian coat of arms), with the ACT receiving routes in 1955 to 1956. They highlighted the interstate links connecting major population, industrial and principal regions of Victoria to the rest of the Australia, in a way that was readily identifiable to interstate travellers. The system was prepared by COSRA (Conference of State Road Authorities), held between 1953 and 1954: once each state road authority agreed to the scheme, it was rolled out federally. Selected routes were later upgraded into National Highways when the National Roads Act was passed in 1974.

The ACT's National Routes were eventually replaced with the alphanumeric system in 2013: each route was converted to an alphanumeric route number, rendering the black-and-white shield redundant, with each National Route keeping their number during the conversion.

National Highways

With the passing of the National Roads Act in 1974, selected National Routes were further upgraded to the status of a National Highway: interstate roads linking Australia's capital cities and major regional centres that received federal funding, and were of higher importance than other National Routes. These new routes were symbolised by green shields with gold writing (the word "National" along the top of the shield, present in other states' National Highways, was excluded for those within the ACT). Both of the ACT's National Highways - connecting the territory to the Hume Highway, itself later made a National Highway in 1979 - were converted in 1974.

Like National Routes, the ACT's National Highways were also replaced with the alphanumeric system in 2013, both keeping their number during the conversion.

Tourist routes
Canberra had a collection of Tourist Routes, but in 2015, all but Tourist Route 5 were decommissioned, with Route 5 following the next year in 2016; route markers will be progressively removed once their signs require replacement.

See also

Road Infrastructure in Canberra
List of road routes in New South Wales
List of road routes in the Northern Territory
List of road routes in Queensland
List of road routes in South Australia
List of road routes in Tasmania
List of road routes in Victoria
List of road routes in Western Australia

References

Australian Capital Territory
 
Roads